François Colomines (22 June 1895 – 30 December 1980) was a French racing cyclist. He rode in the 1921 Tour de France.

References

1895 births
1980 deaths
French male cyclists
Place of birth missing